The Great Lexicon of Révai (Hungarian "Révai nagy lexikona") is a general lexicon in Hungarian, published by the Révai Brothers Literary Institute between 1911 and 1935. The continuation of the late 20th century is the new lexicon of Révai.

History 
Révay Mór János starting from the large lexicon of Pallas, he wanted to create a modern lexicon containing up-to-date scientific results, therefore he involved almost the entire Hungarian scientific world in the editing. The editorial staff had a total of 877 staff members – it would be unworthy to highlight anyone – 149 former university professors, 50 academic members, 20 physicists and mathematicians, 27 ministers or secretaries of state, 69 lawyers and 33 doctors.

The twenty volumes without completion contain about 1,050 pages (16,671 two-column pages), 230,000 headings, about 113 million letters, and thousands of figures. The color map appendices were prepared by Révai Cartography specifically for this purpose.

Almost half of the scope is geographical (14%), legal (6.5%), world historical (6%), medical (5%), zoological (4%), botanical (3.5%), artistic (3%), deals with Hungarian historical (3%) topics.

New edition 

In 1995–96, Babits Publishing House in Szekszárd published twenty-one volumes of the great lexicon of Révai in a similar edition.

It can be read electronically on the website of the Hungarian Electronic Library: http://mek.oszk.hu/06700/06758/pdf/

Order of volumes

Sources 
 volumes of the work
 OSzK
 Révay Mór János sírja a Kerepesi Temetőben
  Iskolázás, értelmiség és tudomány a 19–20. századi Magyarországon

Hungarian encyclopedias